Gallopin' Gals is a 1940 American one-reel Technicolor animated film directed by William Hanna and Joseph Barbera and produced by Fred Quimby. It belonged to the screwball comedy genre. It was released by Metro-Goldwyn Mayer in October 26, 1940, alongside the feature film Hullabaloo. The announcer at the race was played by Truman Bradley.

Plot
The film is a typical animated screwball comedy made in the style of such films as The Women (1939), except for the fact that the characters are fillies at the Kentucky Derby with New York accents, gossiping about some of the other contestants.

The underdog of the story is a shy, lonely horse named Maggie who has never won a race in her life and suffers from hay fever. During the race, the other horses competing are distracted by a photo finish. They fall short of the finish line, in second place simultaneously, while the picture is taken. Maggie crosses in front of them, winning the race.

References

External links

1940 films
1940 animated films
1940 short films
1940 comedy films
1940s American animated films
1940s animated short films
1940s screwball comedy films
Short films directed by Joseph Barbera
Short films directed by William Hanna
Films set in Kentucky
American horse racing films
Metro-Goldwyn-Mayer animated short films
Animated films about horses
Films scored by Scott Bradley
Films with screenplays by Henry Wilson Allen
Films produced by Fred Quimby
Metro-Goldwyn-Mayer cartoon studio short films
1940s English-language films